The 1958 World Men's Handball Championship was the third team handball World Championship. It was held in the German Democratic Republic between 27 February and 8 March 1958. Germany sent a united team composed of players from the GDR and the FRG. Sweden won the championship.

Preliminary round 

Group A   .......       Venue: ERFURT

Group B   .......    Venue: EAST BERLIN

Group C.......Venue: MAGDEBURG

Group D........Venue: ERFURT

Main round 

Group 1........Venue: EAST BERLIN

Group 2.......Venue: LEIPZIG

Final round 

Final matches .........Venue: EAST BERLIN

Final standings

References 

Source: International Handball Federation

World Handball Championship tournaments
H
H 
H 

World Mens Handball Championship, 1958
World Mens Handball Championship, 1958
World Mens Handball Championship, 1958